VTV is the second private TV channel of the Maldives. It was inaugurated in 2008. The channel is run under the umbrella of V Media Group which include VFM, Veekly and VNews. It was founded by famous businessman and politician of Maldives Hon. Qasim Ibrahim. It is one of the most watched channel in Maldives. VTV was one of the TV stations which introduced new features, such as an official app. VTV was the first Maldivian channel to show the FIFA World Cup in HD format. The channel was attacked many times during the revolution of Maldives in 2012. This channel's slogan is Aharenge TV ("My TV"). This channel brings many sports and political events to the local.
Shows of VTV
Fasmanzaru,
Ameenge Malaafai,
Nuvagadi,
Kudakudhinge Bageechaa,
V Kids,
V select,
Friday night with Hamysh,
V Sports,
VTV School singing competition,
Kushuge Hafaraiy and many more.

History
VTV is the first media outlet of IBC (now VMEDIA) while being the second private TV channel to operate in the Maldives. Since its inception in 2008, VTV had been broadcasting via satellite to a global audience, covering the whole of Maldives and neighboring countries, reaching out to Europe and Middle East. The live video signal of VTV is streamed via internet and can be viewed from any part of the world. VTV broadcasts mainly in the local language, with update news and current affairs programs, sports and entertainment. Backed by a state of the art technical facility and enthusiastic staff base, VTV is one of the most watched Private TV channel of Maldives. With the acquisition of broadcast rights of major sporting events like the FIFA World Cup of 2010 and 2014, VTV has established itself as a credible and a reliable broadcaster in Maldives.
VTV has faced many attacks during the revolution of Maldives in 2012 including an arson attack which damaged the channel's operating building severely.

VFM
VFM, a radio station by VMEDIA, broadcasts its Radio programs on FM 99 MHz covering almost 80% of the country. With a terrestrial network established, VFM has the widest coverage among the private Radio networks. VFM is also broadcast via satellite, streamed via internet and telecast as visual radio during the off-peak hours of VTV. The channel covers news, sports, entertainment, and informative programs.

Veekly
Veekly is the result of VMEDIA's effort to hold a key position in the field of publishing. Veekly is a weekly magazine printed and published in full color, targeted at the youth, covering a wide range of happenings across the nation. Veekly is the official in-flight magazine of FlyMe, the domestic carrier of Villa Air. Veekly is also regarded the only consistent weekly magazine published in the country.

VNews
Vnews.mv is the main news source of VMEDIA. Published in the local language and in English, vnews.mv is a leading news website with a viewership of over 30,000 unique hits every day. News is updated minute by minute as it happens. Live blogging and many other features attract readers from across the globe. A VNews iPhone app is also available to download for free on the Apple App Store.

References

External links
 VTV Website

Mass media in the Maldives
Television channels and stations established in 2008
Television channels in the Maldives